Sir Robert Henry Meade  (16 December 1835 – 8 January 1898) was a British civil servant and the Head of the Colonial Office between 1892 and 1897.

Life
Meade was the second son of the 3rd Earl of Clanwilliam and Lady Elizabeth Herbert. Clanwilliam, an Irish peer, had served as Private Secretary to Lord Castlereagh and subsequently as Parliamentary Under-Secretary of State for Foreign Affairs.

Meade was educated at Harrow School and matriculated at Exeter College, Oxford in 1854, graduating B.A. in 1859 and M.A. in 1860. He formed a close and affectionate relationship with his mother’s brother, Sidney Herbert. 
In 1859, he sat the examination for the Foreign Office, which he entered as a third class clerk. 
The work of a junior clerk in the Foreign Office at the time was tedious, consisting mostly of the copying of confidential documents, but the hours were short (11.00 am to 5.00 pm) and the holidays long. 
Meade escaped this routine in 1860, when he was chosen to accompany Lord Dufferin on his mission to Syria as Commissioner, and again in 1861-1862, when he accompanied the Prince of Wales on an Eastern tour.
 
Following his return, Meade was in attendance on the Queen during her visit to Coburg later in 1862. In June 1864, he was appointed as Private Secretary to Granville Leveson-Gower, 2nd Earl Granville.

In 1868, Meade followed Lord Granville to the Colonial Office, then briefly to the Foreign Office when Granville became Foreign Secretary in 1870; but Meade returned to the Colonial Office in 1871 as Assistant Under-Secretary, becoming Permanent Under-Secretary in 1892. In December 1896, he fell and broke his leg, an injury from which he never recovered: it forced his retirement in March 1897 and he died soon after, in January 1898.

Reputation
Lord Ripon, the Liberal Colonial Secretary between 1892 and 1895, wrote to him in 1895:

Edward Walter Hamilton wrote in his diary on the occasion of Meade's death: "He had great personal charm and throughout his extraordinary fateful life his pluck never failed him."

Family
Meade married, first, Lady Mary Elizabeth Lascelles (the daughter of the 3rd Earl of Harewood), who died in 1866. Their daughter, Mary, died in 1897. He married, secondly, Caroline Georgiana Grenfell (the daughter of Charles William Grenfell MP), who died in 1881. They had one son, Charles Francis Meade (1881–1975).

References

Sources
http://www.proni.gov.uk/records/private/clanwm.htm
"Death Of Sir Robert Meade", The Times, London, 10 January 1898, page 9

External links

Attribution

Permanent Under-Secretaries of State for the Colonies
Knights Grand Cross of the Order of the Bath
Members of HM Foreign Service
Private secretaries in the British Civil Service
Civil servants in the Colonial Office
Principal Private Secretaries to the Secretary of State for Foreign and Commonwealth Affairs
People educated at Harrow School
Alumni of Exeter College, Oxford
Younger sons of earls
1898 deaths
1835 births